The Zombies is an extended play 45 rpm record released by the English beat group the Zombies in 1964.

Track listing
Side One:
 "Kind of Girl" - (Argent)
 "Sometimes" - (Argent)

Side Two:
 "It’s Alright"  - (Argent)
 "Summertime"  - (George Gershwin, Ira Gershwin, DuBose Heyward)

The three songs written by Rod Argent appear on the 1999 re-issue of the Zombies’ first album, Begin Here, as bonus tracks.  The song "Summertime" was the only song off the EP that was included on that album when it was initially released in 1965.

Personnel
The Zombies
 Colin Blunstone – lead vocals
 Rod Argent – organ, vocals
 Paul Atkinson – guitar, vocals
 Chris White – bass, vocals
 Hugh Grundy – drums

References

1964 debut EPs
Decca Records EPs
The Zombies albums
EPs by British artists
Pop rock EPs